
Year 497 BC was a year of the pre-Julian Roman calendar. At the time, it was known as the Year of the Consulship of Atratinus and Augurinus (or, less frequently, year 257 Ab urbe condita). The denomination 497 BC for this year has been used since the early medieval period, when the Anno Domini calendar era became the prevalent method in Europe for naming years.

Events 
 By place 

 Greece 
 Artybius ends the rebellion in Cyprus.
 The Persians launch an expedition on the Hellespont and later Caria.

Rome 
 December 17 – Consecration of the newly constructed Temple of Saturn in the Roman Forum, and Saturnalia festival first celebrated.

Births

Deaths 
Onesilus, King of Salamis

References